Mahmoud Hassan Hammoud (3 July 1964 – 4 December 2021), also known as Hajj Mahmoud Hammoud, was a Lebanese football player and manager.

Hammoud played as a striker for Nejmeh and the Lebanon national team during the 1980s and 1990s. He coached various Lebanese Premier League sides, most notably Ahed and Shabab Sahel, as well as the Lebanon national team

Club career 
Having joined Nejmeh's youth system in 1979, Hammoud was promoted to the first team in 1983. He joined Qatari side Al-Khor in 1988 for one season, following the 1988 Arab Nations Cup. Hammoud was the 1993–94 Lebanese Premier League top scorer with Nejmeh, scoring 15 goals during the season. In 1994, he was already captain of his team. The forward retired in 1996 having won two Lebanese FA Cups, in 1986–87 and 1988–89. During his career, Hammoud scored over 90 goals for Nejmeh.

International career 
Hammoud played for both the Lebanon national under-20 and under-23 teams. Making his debut for the national team in 1985, Hammoud represented Lebanon at the 1988 Arab Cup.

Managerial career 
Hammoud began his coaching career at newly-promoted Ahed, during the 1998–99 season. After working as an assistant coach for the Lebanon national team twice, Hammoud became the head coach of the Lebanon national under-23 team during the 2004 Summer Olympics qualifiers, between 2003 and 2004.

He took charge of the Lebanon national team for a short period of time in December 2003. He was reappointed manager on 8 February 2004, before ending his managerial stint with Lebanon on 3 July of the same year.

In October 2013, Hammoud became coach of Akhaa Ahli Aley, staying there until the end of the season. After helping Shabab Sahel to a historic third place in the 2020–21 Lebanese Premier League, Hammoud's contract was renewed for a further season.

Death 
On 6 November 2021, Hammoud tested positive for COVID-19, amid its pandemic in Lebanon. He was sent to Sahel General Hospital in Haret Hreik, Beirut. Hammoud died from the virus on 4 December 2021, at the age of 57.

Career statistics

International 
Scores and results list Lebanon's goal tally first, score column indicates score after each Hammoud goal.

Honours

Player 
Nejmeh
 Lebanese FA Cup: 1986–87, 1988–89

Individual
 Lebanese Premier League top goalscorer: 1993–94

Manager 
Ahed
 Lebanese Premier League: 2014–15
 Lebanese Elite Cup: 2015
 Lebanese Super Cup: 2015

Shabab Sahel
 Lebanese Elite Cup: 2019

Individual
 Lebanese Premier League Best Coach: 2009–10, 2010–11

References

External links

 
 
 
 
 

1964 births
2021 deaths
People from Sidon District
Lebanese footballers
Association football forwards
Lebanese Premier League players
Nejmeh SC players
Lebanese expatriate footballers
Expatriate footballers in Qatar
Lebanese expatriate sportspeople in Qatar
Qatar Stars League players
Al-Khor SC players
Lebanon youth international footballers
Lebanon international footballers
Lebanese football managers
Lebanon national football team managers
Lebanese Premier League managers
Al Ahed FC managers
Shabab Al Sahel FC managers
Akhaa Ahli Aley FC managers
Al Nabi Chit SC managers
Lebanese Premier League top scorers
Deaths from the COVID-19 pandemic in Lebanon